IK Viljan is a sports club in Strängnäs, Sweden, established in 1914. The club runs soccer, earlier even bandy. The men's bandy team played in the Swedish top division in 1942. and 1943.

The men's soccer team has played in the Swedish third division.

References

External links
Official website 

1914 establishments in Sweden
Defunct bandy clubs in Sweden
Football clubs in Södermanland County
Sport in Strängnäs
Sports clubs established in 1914